André Raynaud (10 November 1904 – 20 March 1937) was a French cyclist. After winning two six-day road races, in Paris in 1929 and in Marseille in 1930, he focused on motor-paced racing and won the national championships and  UCI Motor-paced World Championships in 1936.

His bike failed during a motor-paced race at the Sportpaleis in Antwerp on 20 March 1937. He was hit by a nearby motorcycle and died upon impact. His wife died 4 years earlier.

References

1904 births
1937 deaths
French male cyclists
Sportspeople from Haute-Vienne
UCI Track Cycling World Champions (men)
French track cyclists
Cyclists who died while racing
Sport deaths in Belgium
Cyclists from Nouvelle-Aquitaine